Pantai Irama is a state constituency in Kelantan, Malaysia, that has been represented in the Kelantan State Legislative Assembly. This one of two state constituencies in Kelantan have switched name from the old name in 2018.

History

Election results

References

Kelantan State Legislative Assembly
Kelantan state constituencies